English space rock group Hawkwind formed in London in 1969 when singer and guitarist Dave Brock met bass player John Harrison. The first incarnation of the group included lead guitarist Mick Slattery and drummer Terry Ollis, who were soon joined by friends Nik Turner and Dik Mik Davies on saxophones and electronics respectively.

The group have been operative ever since, with only a one-year break when they surfaced under the alternate name Hawklords. Personnel changes have been regular and numerous, almost on a yearly basis, with only Brock being an ever-present.

Band members with significant recording careers outside of Hawkwind include Huw Lloyd-Langton, Robert Calvert, Lemmy Kilmister, Simon House, Paul Rudolph, Adrian Shaw, Steve Swindells, Tim Blake, Ginger Baker and Alan Davey.

Hawkwind also credited non-musician members of their crew, such as lighting engineer Jonathan Smeeton (known as Liquid Len); dancers Stacia, Renée LeBallister, Tony Crerar and Julie Murray-Anderson; lyricist and occasional guest Michael Moorcock. Hawkwind's distinctive graphic design in the 1970s was created by Barney Bubbles.

Members

Current members

Former members

Additional musicians

Session/one off musicians

Timeline

Lineups

References

Lists of members by band